The 2022 Go Bowling at The Glen was a NASCAR Cup Series race held on August 21, 2022, at Watkins Glen International in Watkins Glen, New York. Contested over 90 laps on the  road course, it was the 25th race of the 2022 NASCAR Cup Series season.

Report

Background

Watkins Glen International (nicknamed "The Glen") is an automobile race track located in Watkins Glen, New York at the southern tip of Seneca Lake. It was long known around the world as the home of the Formula One United States Grand Prix, which it hosted for twenty consecutive years (1961–1980), but the site has been home to road racing of nearly every class, including the World Sportscar Championship, Trans-Am, Can-Am, NASCAR Cup Series, the International Motor Sports Association and the IndyCar Series.

Initially, public roads in the village were used for the race course. In 1956 a permanent circuit for the race was built. In 1968 the race was extended to six hours, becoming the 6 Hours of Watkins Glen. The circuit's current layout has more or less been the same since 1971, although a chicane was installed at the uphill Esses in 1975 to slow cars through these corners, where there was a fatality during practice at the 1973 United States Grand Prix. The chicane was removed in 1985, but another chicane called the "Inner Loop" was installed in 1992 after J.D. McDuffie's fatal accident during the previous year's NASCAR Winston Cup event.

The circuit is known as the Mecca of North American road racing and is a very popular venue among fans and drivers. The facility is currently owned by International Speedway Corporation.

Entry list
 (R) denotes rookie driver.
 (i) denotes driver who is ineligible for series driver points.

Practice

Practice results

Qualifying

Qualifying results

Race
The race start was delayed due to lightning.

Stage results

Stage One
Laps: 20

Stage Two
Laps: 20

Final stage results

Stage Three
Laps: 50

Race statistics
 Lead changes: 12 among 9 different drivers
 Cautions/Laps: 5 for 11
 Red flags: 0
 Time of race: 2 hours, 17 minutes and 52 seconds
 Average speed:

Media

Television
USA covered the race on the television side. as part of a Radio style Broadcast for the race. Rick Allen and Steve Letarte called the race from the broadcast booth. MRN broadcaster Mike Bagley called the race from the Esses, Dale Earnhardt Jr. had the call from Turn 5, and Jeff Burton had the call from a platform located off Turn 10 that covers Turns 6–7. Dave Burns, Parker Kligerman and Marty Snider handled the pit road duties from pit lane.

Radio
Motor Racing Network had the radio call for the race, which was simulcast on Sirius XM NASCAR Radio. Alex Hayden, Jeff Striegle, and former crew chief Todd Gordon covered the action when the field raced down the front straightaway. Dave Moody called the race when the field raced thru the esses. Kyle Rickey covered the action when the field raced thru the inner loop and turn 5 and Jason Toy covered the action in turn 10 & 11. Steve Post, Dillon Welch, Chris Wilner, and Kim Coon called the action from the pits for MRN.

Standings after the race

Drivers' Championship standings

Manufacturers' Championship standings

Note: Only the first 16 positions are included for the driver standings.
. – Driver has clinched a position in the NASCAR Cup Series playoffs.

References

Go Bowling at The Glen
Go Bowling at The Glen
Go Bowling at The Glen
NASCAR races at Watkins Glen International